Glaslyn is a lake in the Snowdonia National Park in Gwynedd, north-west Wales.

Geography

Glaslyn is the source of the Afon Glaslyn, the major river of Gwynedd, which runs east to the reservoir of  Llyn Llydaw before turning south-west to reach the sea at Porthmadog.

In 2020, small particles of microplastic pollution – deposited by rain – were found in the lake, triggering a further investigation of the extent of environmental damage in UK lakes and mountains.

Folklore

In Welsh folklore, Arthur had Bedivere throw his sword Excalibur into Glaslyn, where Arthur's body was later placed in a boat to be carried away to Afallon. Arthur's men then retreated to a cave on the slopes of Y Lliwedd, where they are said to sleep until such time as they are needed. Merlin is supposed to have hidden the golden throne of Britain among the cliffs north of Crib y Ddysgl when the Saxons invaded.

They tempted the monster out of the water with a young girl, before securing it with chains and dragging it to Glaslyn. A large stone known as Maen Du'r Arddu, below Clogwyn Du'r Arddu, is supposed to have magical powers. Like several other sites in Wales, it is said that if two people spend the night there, one will become a great poet while the other will become insane. Llyn Coch in Cwm Clogwyn has been associated with the Tylwyth Teg (fairies), including a version of the fairy bride legend.

See also
RSPB Glaslyn Osprey Project

References

Beddgelert
Lakes of Gwynedd
Tourism in Gwynedd
Lakes of Snowdonia
Tourism in Snowdonia
Sites of Special Scientific Interest in West Gwynedd